The Chero dynasty or Chyavana dynasty was a polity that ruled the northern regions of the Indian subcontinent, corresponding to the present-day Indian states of Bihar, Uttar Pradesh, and Jharkhand, after the fall of the Pala Empire; their rule lasted from the 12th century CE to the 19th century CE.

The Chero/Chyavana Kingdom territory stretched from Upper Gangetic plain in west to the lower Ganga plain in East and from the Madhesh region in north to the Kaimur Range and Chota Nagpur Plateau in south. At its peak of reign, the Chero/Chyavana kingdom extended from an area of Prayagraj in the west to Banka in the east and from Champaran in the north to Chota Nagpur Plateau in the south. They survived and remained independent of the Turkic and Mughal rule and at worst were their tributaries.

They established principalities in the Shahabad, Saran, Champaran, Muzzafarpur and Palamu. Bihea was capital of Chero Raja Ghughulia. Tirawan in Bhojpur region was second capital where Raja Sitaram Rai, the son of Raja Ram Rai was ruling chief. Chainpur was capital of third principalities where Raja Salabahim as its ruler. In Sasaram, the capital was Deo Markande with Raja Phulchand as chief.

History

Origin
Cheros rose to power in 12th century after fall of Pala Empire.

Conflict with Afghans
According to Ahmad Yadgar, Sher Shah Suri wanted to take possession of a White elephant from Maharata Chero. On refusal of Maharata Chero, Sher Shah dispatched Khawas Khan with 4000 horses against the Raja. The Chero chief was besieged and compelled to surrender the elephant and Khawas Khan captured huge booty. According to Abbas Sarwani,  the author of Tarikh-i-Sher Shahi the Maharata Chero became so powerful in Shahabad that Sher Shah had to send Khawas Khan to lead an expedition against him. Due to battle of Chausa, the campaign was suspended. Soon after the battle of Chausa, Sher Shah dispatched Khawas Khan and Chero chief was defeated and killed.

Rebellion against the Mughals
In 1590, Man Singh after suppressing chief of Kharagpur and Gidhour, attacked Anant Rai of Palamu. Cheros offered strong resistance to invading army but they were outnumbered. A large number of them were killed and many taken as prisoners. Raja Man Singh captured valuable booty including fifty four elephants. Palamu brought under Mughal administration. Soon after death of Akbar, Anant Rai drove out imperial troops out and declared his independence. In 1607, Jahangir ordered an expedition against Anant Rai. Mughal officials launched repeated attacks on Cheros and Chero had to shift their capital into deep jungle.
   
The Cheros of Palamu began to grow in power again in the 17th century and under the leadership of Pratap Rai, they started to raid cattle from neighbouring Mughal districts. Because of this, Shah Jahan sent the Mughal Governor of Bihar, Shaista Khan, on an expedition to subdue the Cheros and stop the rebellion from taking place. During this expedition, the Mughals had trouble reaching the Chero stronghold in Palamu due to the hilly and forested terrain which made it almost inaccessible. Eventually, after 6 months the Mughals managed to surround the Palamu Forts and Pratap Rai surrendered which the Mughals accepted.

War with the Ujjainiyas
The Cheros had lost their territory in Western Bihar in the 14th century to the invading Ujjainiya Rajputs who were under the leadership of Hunkar Sahi. In the ensuing battles, both sides suffered many casualties with the Cheros losing more than 10,000 men. In 1607, a number of Chero chief combined to launch a spirited attacks against Ujjaniniyas. One of the descendants of Sitaram Rai, Kumkum Chand Jharap drove out Ujjainiyas from Bhojpur region and capture major parts of territory. The Ujjainiyas could not offer much resistance because their chief Raja Narayan Mal who had usurped the throne after disposing Raja Mukut Mani in 1607, had gone to Mughal court to get his confirmation as the rulers of Ujjainiyas from Jahangir. He brought these  developments to the notice of emperor and also got assurance of imperial support against the Cheros. Immediately after return, he raised his headquarters at Buxar, regrouped the Ujjainiyas and started making efforts to capture the lost territory. Kum Kum Chand Jharap upon realising he would not able to resist the onslaught of Narayan Mal alone for long, appealed Cheros of Sonpari reign for his help. Large numbers of Cheros led by Raja of Khaddar, Anandichak and Balaunja (Japla) joined Kum Kum Chand Jharap. They repaired the trenches around the Tirawan forts, and reinforced it with war materials.

The rival armies faced each other for twenty-one days. On twenty-second day Cheros made determined attacks on the Ujjaniyas. The Ujjaniyas move cautiously firmly behind their shield and succeeded in repulsing  Cheros from their position. They move further and launched surprise attacks on the fort of Tirawan. The besieged were under tremendous pressure because of shortage of foods and war materials. The morals of besieged was so low that they contemplating vacating the fort. Fortunately, Raja Madha Mundra of Lohardaga came to help them.

Then  Cheros fought bravely and foiled the attempt of Ujjaniyas to capture the fort. A large number of Ujjaniyas killed or force to retreat. Pratap Singh, the brother of Narayan Mal was in front of retreating Ujjaniya army. Chero mistook him for Narayan Mal and surround him.

At that time, Thakur Rai Kalyan Singh, the Bakshi of Mughal imperial army who had been left at Buxar by Narayan Mal with half the army reached Bhojpur and joined them. Words spread in the camp that imperial army had arrived to help the  Ujjaniyas. Chero once again demoralised however they continue their struggle. On the other hand, with this new reinforcement Narayan Mal attack on Cheros from all four sides with renewed vigour. Chero too responded vigorously. All male member joined the battle and women help them by throwing stones with slings. A fierce fight ensued and the commander of both the armies showed great valour. The Ujjaniyas succeeded in defeating the Cheros. A large number of Cheros, including Sharan Jharap the Raja of Lohardaga, Haratpal and  Raja Madha Mundra, were killed in the battle. A huge booty came into possession of Ujjaniyas. Deogaon and Kothi the forts of cheros razed to the ground. The battle was fought in 1611 on ninth day of Dusshera. Narayan Mal was indisputably accepted as leader of Ujjaniyas. He destroyed the power of Cheros and expelled them from Bhojpur region. After ruling for decades Narayan Mal was killed by his own kinsmen in a family feud.

Rule in Palamu

It is believed that a Chero chief of Shahabad, Bhagwant Rai, took service under the Raksel Rajput chief Man Singh of Palamu. Bhagwant Rai assassinated Man Singh, taking advantage of the local Raja's absence at a ceremony at Surguja to raise the standard of revolt and founded his own kingdom around 1572. Bhagwat Rai, the son of Shahbal Rai, a contemporary of Jahangir founded the Chero rule in   Palamu about the year 1613 A.D. He invaded Palamu from Rohtas side and with the assistance of some Rajput chiefs, the ancestors of modern Thakurais of Ranka and Chainpur drove out the ruling  Raksel Rajput family into Surguja. After Bhagwat Rai, Bhupal Rai and Medini Rai ruled Palamu. Medini Rai constructed new fort. After death of Medini Rai, the dynasty fell apart due to power struggle and in-fighting in the ruling family. the administration slowly and indirectly passed into hand of various ministers and advisers who were driven by personal gain and fame. Then Pratap Rai, Rudra Rai, Dikpal Rai, Saheb Rai, Ranjit Rai, Devi Batesh Rai and Jai Kishan Rai ruled Palamu.

In 1770,  the Chitrajeet Rai became 12th Raja of Chero dynasty after the 11th Raja  Jai Kishan Rai, died at Chetna ghat fighting a defiant adviser. Two candidates claiming to be the rightful Raja, one Gopal Rai, grandson of Jaikishan Rai, the other Chitrajit Rai, grandson of the murdered ruling chief Ranjit Rai, brought their suits to the British. The British, more interested in revenue collection than in family quarrels, decided to occupy the fort of Palamu. As Chitrajit's Dewan, Jainath Singh, refused to agree to this even in return for recognition of Chitrajit's claim, the controlling council at Patna decided to support the cause of Goapl Rai. The Nephew of Raja, Gopal Rai immediately created animosity with Raja Chitrajeet Rai and started divulging to British which help them to interfere in the rule of Chero in the Palamu. On 9 January 1771, British East India company ordered Palamu to hand over the fort to Company. Raja Chitrajeet Rai's deewan asked 10 days to do so. On 10th day, Captain Camac of Patna Council asked to lead a contingent against Raja.

On 28 January 1771, Captain Camac and his force laid siege to the fort. On 29 January, he sent a message to Raja asking him to surrender the fort to the East India company. But the Valiant Cheros refused, vowing to  fight on to death to protect their Raja and the fort. The Chero warriors stationed at new fort returned to the old fort due to water scarcity. This provided opportunity to British force to occupy the new fort. Since the new fort was located on the hillock, it allowed Captain Camac an opportunity to gauge to actual strength of Chero warriors stationed inside the old fort. Sensing inadequacy of forces and resources, Captain Camac sent a message to his commander at Patna to send heavier cannon and shells. On meanwhile, the gallant Cheros kept the British ground forces  on the defensive with their continuous shelling from the top of the old fort. On 2 February 1771, the British reinforcements with their 6-pound cannons and extra rations were attacked by the Cheros, who made away with rations and killed some soldiers. This forced captain Camac to ask for additional 12 cannons and more rations. On 4 February 1771, Chero again intercepted British force on their way to Palamu, looted the rations and killed many soldiers. By 7 February, Captain Camac was on the point of retreating. His soldiers attempted to scale the wall of old fort under cover of darkness but Cheros foiled all such efforts. In the meantime another 12 pound cannons with ammunition and extra reinforcements reached the fort. By 19 March 1771, the old fort was surrounded by a numerically superior British force.

The besieged fort was then shelled by British force but outer wall was so strong and well fortified that they failed to demolish it in order to gain entry. At this point, the captain Camac cleverly sought the help of Akhauri Udwant Rai, promising to establish him as future king with plenty of wealth. Akhauri Rai helped Camec contact a man called Sugandh Rai, who knew a secret point to entry into the fort. When Raja Medini Rai was rebuilding the old fort, he had built a corner outer wall using mud mortar, so that in an emergency his people could escape breaking through this part of the wall. The secret entrance to the fort was divulged to the Captain Camac, who immediately stationed his 12-pound cannon there and shelled continuously. Finally breaking through the advance into the fort. On 21 March 1771, Camec led his soldiers in defeating the soldiers and capturing the fort. British installed Gopal Rai as King on the agreeing to pay an annual tribute of Rs. 12,000.

The Dewan of Palamu, Raj Jainath Singh returned from Ramgarh and reorganized the Cheros. In April 1772, they renewed their attack on the British force. To contain the determined onslaught of the Cheros, Leutinant Thomas Scot was sent with a strong additional force. Nevertheless, the 400 cheros and Kharwars proved too strong for British. On 26 April, after sergeant Pelwin was killed and Lieutenant Scot badly injured, the British force gave up and  the fort was recaptured by the Cheros.    
 Gopal Rai was removed after a trial in 1776. His minor brother Biswanath succeeded him and Gajraj Rai became the manager. But their position was assailed by Sugandh Rai and Sheo Prasad Singh. The Governor ordered that Bishwanth Rai, the third brother of Gopal Rai and not Gajraj or Sugandh, was the successor. Since this order was resisted Major Grawford was sent to Palamu with military force to restore peace. Major Crawford managed to capture Gajraj and Sugandha. Raja Bishwanath Rai died in 1783. he was followed by Churaman Rai. His action provoked the tenantry, and led to the Chero insurrection in 1800. The leader was Bhukhan Singh, a Chero. The British came with a force and suppressed the insurrection but by that time the Raja and the administration had been reduced to bankruptcy. An Assistant Collector of Bihar was appointed to look after the revenue collection in the western part of the province. Parry, the Assistant Collector who took over in 1811 made the first settlement of revenue in 1812. he annulled the Sanad, granted by Churaman Rai and took over direct collection. The Palamu estate was attacked. In 1812, the sale of Palamu estate was authorized and it was accordingly sold for Rs. 51,000. The assessment of the estate was reduced to Rs. 9,000 in 1814 when it was granted to Ghanshyam Singh of Deo as a reward to his help to the British in suppressing the Cheros and the Kharwars.

Rulers

References

States and territories established in the 12th century
States and territories disestablished in the 19th century
History of Bihar
Dynasties of India
Kingdoms of Bihar
History of Jharkhand